The Pekhorka is a river in the Moscow Region in Russia, a left tributary of the Moskva.

Flows from the north point in 1,5 km from Lukino village to the south, where it passes Moscow through Izmailovo, Kuskovo and Kosino (that part of the river in Moscow is about 10 km). Three ponds - one on the north of Lukino, one near Pekhra-Pokrovskoye village and one in Balashiha-2 microdistrict.

Balashikha and Zheleznodorozhniy cities are located on the river as well as Tomilino and Kraskovo settlements.

Name etymology probably comes from the Old Slavonic «Ṕh» (Cyrillic: «пьх») with the «ur» (Cyrillic: «ъръ») suffix which means «to push».

River was included into the 1971 Moscow General Development Plant which constitutes special emphasis on the construction of Eastern Navigable Channel. This channel was intended to decongest the navigation through Moscow via Moscow River. Pekhorka would become a part of Lyubertsy Reservoir, the largest water basin in Moscow Region. Channel was never built.

References

Rivers of Moscow Oblast